Cedar Bluff is an unincorporated community in Cedar County, Iowa, United States.

A post office was established here in 1841; it was then called Cedar River. In 1849, its name was changed to Gower's Ferry. It received its present name, Cedar Bluff, in 1859.

References

Unincorporated communities in Cedar County, Iowa
Unincorporated communities in Iowa
1841 establishments in Iowa Territory